Transit number may refer to:
 ABA routing transit number, a bank code used in the United States
 Transit number, the branch identification portion of a Canadian bank routing number